La Buvette is a restaurant, wine bar and grocery store in the Old Market neighborhood of Omaha, Nebraska, United States. Established in 1991 by Mark and Vera Mercer, initially solely as a delicatessen, its food menu is inspired by French cuisine, and described by The New York Times as being "charmingly un-American". Its large wine selection has been recognized nationally.

The restaurant's chef is Julie Friederich, whose husband, Keith, is the baker. Breads are made using Parisian methods.

Co-founder and Omaha native Mark Mercer died on September 16, 2019, after a long battle with cancer.

The business is located in the Rocco Brothers (also known as the Craftsmen Guild) building, which dates to 1895 and is on the National Register of Historic Places as part of the Old Market Historic District.

Gallery

References

External links

Restaurants in Omaha, Nebraska
Restaurants established in 1991
1991 establishments in Nebraska